Olah may refer to:

 Oláh, a Hungarian word that means Vlach (Romanian)
 Oláh (surname)
 Korban Olah, burnt offering ritual in Judaism
 Olah reagent in chemistry named after George Andrew Olah

See also 
 Wallach (disambiguation)